Tarnov can be:
Tarnov, Bardejov, a village in Slovakia
Tarnów, Poland, anglicized as Tarnov
Tarnov, Nebraska, named after the Polish town from which many of the original inhabitants came